Droplet nuclei are aerosols formed from the evaporation of respiratory droplets. They are generally smaller than 5 μm in diameter. Droplet nuclei are formed by the "dried residua of larger respiratory droplets". These particles are "the vehicle for airborne respiratory disease transmission, which are the dried-out residual of droplets possibly containing infectious pathogens". Diseases such as tuberculous and COVID-19 can be transmitted via droplet nuclei.

See also
 Basic reproduction number

References

Disease transmission
Particulates